Joshua Damon Upton (June 17, 1870 – November 20, 1964) was an American college football player and coach. He served as the head football coach at Tufts University from 1897 to 1898, compiling a record of 7–16. Upton died on November 20, 1964, at Mary Alley Hospital in Marblehead, Massachusetts.

Head coaching record

References

External links
 Sports-Reference profile
 

1870 births
1964 deaths
19th-century players of American football
American football tackles
Harvard Crimson football players
Tufts Jumbos football coaches
People from North Reading, Massachusetts
Sportspeople from Middlesex County, Massachusetts
Players of American football from Massachusetts